The 2002–03 St. Francis Terriers men's basketball team represented St. Francis College during the 2002–03 NCAA Division I men's basketball season. The team was coached by Ron Ganulin, who was in his twelfth year at the helm of the St. Francis Terriers. The Terrier's home games were played at the  Generoso Pope Athletic Complex. The team has been a member of the Northeast Conference since 1981.

The Terriers were 14-16 overall on the season and 9-9 in conference play, yet the Terriers qualified for the NEC Tournament. During the Tournament the Terriers were able to upset Central Connecticut and Fairleigh Dickinson in the quarterfinals and semifinals, respectively, and made it to the NEC Tournament finals. The Terriers were only one win shy of participating in the programs first NCAA Tournament before losing to Wagner 61–78 on the road.

Roster

Schedule and results

|-
!colspan=12 style="background:#0038A8; border: 2px solid #CE1126;;color:#FFFFFF;"| Regular season

|-
!colspan=12 style="background:#0038A8; border: 2px solid #CE1126;;color:#FFFFFF;"| 2003 NEC tournament

References

St. Francis Brooklyn Terriers men's basketball seasons
St. Francis
2003 in sports in New York City
2002 in sports in New York City